The SPL Helsingin piiri (Helsinki Football Association) is one of the 12 district organisations of the Football Association of Finland. It administers lower tier football in Helsinki.

Background 
Suomen Palloliitto Helsingin piiri, commonly referred to as SPL Helsingin piiri or SPL Helsinki, is the governing body for football in Helsinki. Based in Helsinki, the Association's General Secretary is Kimmo J. Lipponen.

The association was founded on 9 January 1924 and is the oldest District Football Association in Finland. SPL Vaasa was established 6 days later and SPL Turku on 5 May 1924.  Since 1970 the organisation has only covered the city of Helsinki when the 13 surrounding municipalities formed the new SPL Keski-Uusimaa (which was later to become part of SPL Uusimaa). On 31 December 2009 SPL Helsinki had 137 member clubs and 14,034 registered players. The District's mission statement seeks to enable all to enjoy soccer at their respective ability levels and in a variety of roles. The District supports its members needs and demand for football on both a competitive and recreational basis as well as providing supporting services for its membership.

Member clubs

Existing clubs

Previous clubs

League Competitions 
SPL Helsingin piiri run the following league competitions:

Men's Football
 Division 3 – Kolmonen  –  one section
 Division 4 – Nelonen  –  two sections
 Division 5 – Vitonen  –  three sections
 Division 6 – Kutonen  –  four sections
 Division 7 – Seiska  –  three sections

Ladies Football
 Division 3 – Kolmonen  –  one section
 Division 4 and 5 – Nelonen and Vitonen  –  four sections

Footnotes

References

External links 
 SPL Helsingin piiri Official Website 

H
Sports organizations established in 1924